Antonin Manavian (born April 26, 1987) is a French professional ice hockey defenceman who is currently playing for Brûleurs de Loups of the Ligue Magnus.

Playing career
Manavian played two seasons with Hungarian club, Alba Volán Székesfehérvár of the EBEL before leaving as a free agent following the 2016–17 season. On May 26, 2017, Manavian agreed to a one-year deal with neighbouring DEL outfit, Krefeld Pinguine. He was later released from his contract before the season and returned to Alba Volán Székesfehérvár.

International play
He participated at the 2009, 2010, 2012 and 2013 IIHF World Championship as a member of the France National men's ice hockey team. Of Armenian descent. Manavian was later named to the France men's national ice hockey team for competition at the 2014 IIHF World Championship.

References

External links

1987 births
Living people
Acadie–Bathurst Titan players
Fehérvár AV19 players
Bakersfield Condors (1998–2015) players
Brûleurs de Loups players
Dragons de Rouen players
Ducs d'Angers players
Ethnic Armenian sportspeople
French ice hockey defencemen
French people of Armenian descent
Gatineau Olympiques players
HC TWK Innsbruck players
KHL Medveščak Zagreb players
Ice hockey people from Paris